Stacyville is a city in Mitchell County, Iowa, United States. The population was 458 at the time of the 2020 census.

History
Stacyville was platted in 1856. It was named after its founder, Homer I. Stacy.

Geography
Stacyville is located at  (43.436910, -92.783011).

Demographics

2010 census
As of the census of 2010, there were 494 people, 223 households, and 123 families living in the city. The racial makeup of the city was 97.4% White, 0.8% African American, 0.2% Native American, 0.4% Asian, 0.2% from other races, and 1.0% from two or more races. Hispanic or Latino of any race were 1.2% of the population.

There were 223 households, of which 18.4% had children under the age of 18 living with them, 48.0% were married couples living together, 5.4% had a female householder with no husband present, 1.8% had a male householder with no wife present, and 44.8% were non-families. 39.0% of all households were made up of individuals, and 26% had someone living alone who was 65 years of age or older. The average household size was 2.10 and the average family size was 2.80.

The median age in the city was 51 years. 18.4% of residents were under the age of 18; 6.4% were between the ages of 18 and 24; 17.3% were from 25 to 44; 24.6% were from 45 to 64; and 33.6% were 65 years of age or older. The gender makeup of the city was 49.2% male and 50.8% female.

2000 census
As of the census of 2000, there were 469 people, 211 households, and 121 families living in the city. The racial makeup of the city was 99.79% White and 0.21% Asian.

There were 211 households, out of which 19.4% had children under the age of 18 living with them, 50.2% were married couples living together, 3.3% had a female householder with no husband present, and 42.2% were non-families. 38.9% of all households were made up of individuals, and 19.9% had someone living alone who was 65 years of age or older. The average household size was 2.03 and the average family size was 2.66.

In the city, the population was spread out, with 19.4% under the age of 18, 3.0% from 18 to 24, 19.8% from 25 to 44, 20.5% from 45 to 64, and 37.3% who were 65 years of age or older. The median age was 54 years. For every 100 females, there were 100.4 males. For every 100 females age 18 and over, there were 89.0 males.

The median income for a household in the city was $31,544, and the median income for a family was $36,944. Males had a median income of $26,528 versus $26,667 for females. The per capita income for the city was $16,831. About 2.6% of families and 6.6% of the population were below the poverty line, including 10.1% of those under age 18 and 1.5% of those age 65 or over.

Education
It is within the St. Ansgar Community School District school district.

Visitation School, originally serving grades K-12, occupied a main building that opened in 1923 and a gymnasium. In 1968 the high school closed, making it a K-8 school. The school closed in 2003. The main building became the site of the Stacyville Memories Museum while the Stacyville Community Center and the Kids Care Daycare Center occupied the gymnasium. In 2012 it was announced the main building was to be demolished, with the museum going to the Stacyville Library, though the gymnasium would remain.

References

Cities in Mitchell County, Iowa
Cities in Iowa